The NeverEnding Story (German: Die unendliche Geschichte) is a West German-produced English language epic fantasy film series based on the 1979 novel of the same name by Michael Ende.

The original 1984 film, The NeverEnding Story, was directed and co-written by Wolfgang Petersen and was later followed by two sequels.

The first film adapted the first half of the original novel, while the second half of the novel was used as the rough basis for the second film, The NeverEnding Story II: The Next Chapter.

The third film in the series, The NeverEnding Story III, has an original plot.

Films

Cast and crew

Principal cast

Additional crew and production details

Reception

Critical and public response

References

External links

 The Neverending Story at the Encyclopedia of Fantasy
 
 
 

 
Warner Bros. Pictures franchises
Fantasy film series
German film series
Film series based on fantasy novels